Peter Howitt is an actor.

Peter Howitt may also refer to:

Peter Howitt (set decorator)
Peter Howitt (economist)

See also
Peter Hewitt (disambiguation)